Singa is an extinct Bantu language of Uganda.

References

Languages of Uganda
Great Lakes Bantu languages